Prelude... to Cora is the debut studio album by American jazz trumpeter Ambrose Akinmusire. It was released by Fresh Sound New Talent. Akinmusire composed all but three tracks, including jazz standard "Stablemates" by saxophonist Benny Golson. The album is dedicated to Akinmusire's mother, Cora.

Reception
John Barron of All About Jazz stated: "On Prelude: to Cora, trumpeter Ambrose Akinmusire offers a wide-open musical perspective, inviting a wealth of influences to shape a personalized approach to improvisation and composition. Akinmusire seems content with allowing the music to fall where it may; eschewing trends and any pre-conceived notions about what is expected from a debut recording."

Track listing

Personnel
Ambrose Akinmusire – trumpet
Walter Smith III – tenor saxophone
Aaron Parks – piano
Chris Dingman – vibraphone
Joe Sanders – bass
Justin Brown – drums

Guests
Junko Watanabe – vocals (tracks: 1 5 7)
Logan Richardson – alto sax (tracks: 5 9)

Production
Andy Taub – engineer
Dave Darlington – mastering, mixing
Alicia Vergel De Dios – artwork, design
Jordi Pujol – executive producer

References

External links

2008 debut albums
Ambrose Akinmusire albums